Nakia is an American drama series starring Robert Forster about a Native American police officer in New Mexico. It aired from September 21 to December 28, 1974.

Nakias pilot was the made-for-television movie Nakia, which was broadcast on April 17, 1974.

Cast

 Robert Forster...Deputy Nakia Parker
 Arthur Kennedy...Sheriff Sam Jericho
 Gloria DeHaven...Irene James
 Taylor Lacher...Deputy Hubbel Martin
 John Tenorio, Jr.Half Cub
 Victor Jory...Ben Redearth

Synopsis

Nakia Parker is a full-blooded Navajo in his mid-30s who is a deputy sheriff in the fictional town of Concord in fictional Davis County in 1974 New Mexico. In the sheriffs department, he works for Sheriff Sam Jericho, as does fellow deputy sheriff Hubbel Martin and the office secretary, Irene James. Ben Redearth is a Native American friend of Nakias, and Half Cub is Nakias 12-year-old nephew.

Nakia is often torn between ancient tribal customs and the use of modern police methods. Rather than use a police car, he alternates between driving a pickup truck and riding a horse while investigating cases. Sometimes inscrutable and prone to voicing tribal proverbs, Nakia is deeply committed to protecting his fellow Native Americans from injustice, and at times this leads to opposition from his more narrow-minded white neighbors – including Sheriff Jericho.

Production

Michael Butler and Christopher Trumbo created Nakia, and Charles Larson was its executive producer. Episode directors included Nicholas Colasanto, Alvin Ganzer, Leonard Horn, and Alexander Singer, and episode producers included Larson, David Gerber, Peter Katz, Ernest A. Losso, and George Sunga. Butler, Larson, and Trumbo all wrote for the show, as did Sy Salkowitz, Jim Byrnes, Mark Saha, Phyllis White, and Robert White.

Nakia, a rarity among American television series in its attempt to depict the challenges of modern-day Native Americans, was filmed largely on location in and around Albuquerque, New Mexico.

Broadcast history

The pilot for the series aired on ABC as the made-for-television movie Nakia on April 17, 1974. Nakia premiered as a weekly ABC series on September 21, 1974. In addition to the pilot, thirteen episodes aired before the show, with low ratings in the face of tough competition in its time slot from CBSs The Carol Burnett Show, was cancelled after the broadcast of December 28, 1974. The show aired at 10:00 p.m. on Saturday throughout its run.

Episodes
Sources

References

External links

Nakia opening credits on YouTube
Nakia episode "No Place to Hide" on YouTube

American Broadcasting Company original programming
1974 American television series debuts
1974 American television series endings
1970s American crime drama television series
English-language television shows
Television series by Sony Pictures Television
Television shows set in New Mexico